Vincent Simon may refer to:

 Vincent Simon (footballer) (born 1983)
 Vincent Simon (fencer) (born 1990)